Clean with Passion for Now is a 2018 South Korean television series starring Yoon Kyun-sang, Kim Yoo-jung and Song Jae-rim. It is based on the popular webtoon of the same title by Aengo, which was first published by KakaoPage in 2013, and was later published by Comico Korea in 2015. It aired on JTBC's Mondays and Tuesdays at 21:30 (KST) time slot from November 26, 2018 to February 4, 2019.

Synopsis
Jang Seon-kyul (Yoon Kyun-sang) has wealth and good looks but suffers from severe mysophobia. He is obsessed with cleaning and even owns his own cleaning company. However, he meets a carefree and untidy girl named Gil Oh-sol (Kim Yoo-jung) after she enters his company as a new employee. Oh-sol has worked all sorts of part-time jobs while striving for a full-time job and does not have the luxury to date or clean. She gave up on being neat after facing the tough reality of the world and is known for always wearing her trademark tracksuit. But she has a bright personality and does not mind getting dirty. With the help of Oh-sol, Seon-kyul faces his mysophobia and also falls in love with her.

Cast

Main
 Yoon Kyun-sang as Jang Seon-kyul, a good-looking and wealthy CEO of "Cleaning Fairy", who has mysophobia. 
 Kim Yoo-jung as Gil Oh-sol, a girl with a positive personality. She does not really care about dirtiness and possesses a strong stomach.
 Song Jae-rim as Choi Ha-in / Daniel Choi, a psychiatrist from the Rochester Clinic who lives on the rooftop of Oh-sol's house and is known for being a free spirit.

Supporting

People around Oh-sol
 Kim Won-hae as Gil Gong-tae, Oh-sol's father. A district cleaner.
 Lee Do-hyun as Gil Oh-dol, Oh-sol's younger brother who is a promising Taekwondo athlete.
 Min Do-hee as Min Joo-yeon, Oh-sol's best friend.

People around Seon-kyul
 Kim Hye-eun as Cha Mae-hwa, Seon-kyul's mother.
 Ahn Suk-hwan as Cha Seung-hwan, Seon-kyul's grandfather who is the president of AG Group. 
 Yoo Sun as Secretary Kwon, Seon-kyu's secretary.
 Kim Ki-nam as Secretary Kim

Cleaning Fairies
 Yang Hak-jin as Kim Dong-hyun, a rebellious guy who is good at fighting.
 Cha In-ha as Hwang Jae-min, a dreamer who was chased out of his home.
 Go Geon-han as Jeon Young-shik, Oh-dol's senior at the Taekwondo training center.

Others
 Son Byong-ho as President Yang, Mae-hwa's lover.
 Lee Jin-kwon as President Yang's assistant.
 Choi Yoo-song as Bodhisattva Wang, Ha-in's patient who is a fortune teller.
 Ham Sung-min as an action figure collector

Special appearances
 Choi Woong as Lee Do-jin, Oh-sol's college senior and first love.
 Park Kyung-hye as Ha-in's patient.
 Woo Hyun as Baek Geum-sul, Ha-in's patient, impersonating doctor.
 Na Hae-ryeong as Kim Hye-won, a TV anchor.
 Park Ah-in as Lee Young-eun, a woman in an office cleaned by Oh-sol.
 Jo Ryun as Jung Hye-won, Oh-sol's and Oh-dol's mother.
 Kim Joo-young as actor who knows Jae-min.
 Kim Sun-bin as lawyer.
 Shin So-yul as Seo Ji-hye, receptionist in a hotel.

Production
 The first script reading was held on January 30, 2018 at JTBC building in Sangam-dong.
 The series was set to air in April 2018. However, on February 26, it was revealed that lead actress Kim Yoo-jung was diagnosed with hypothyroidism, and would be focusing on treatment. It has since halted filming and its broadcast has been delayed to the second half of the year.
 On May 25, JTBC announced that the production would resume filming in August 2018 for a slated premiere in November 2018. Ahn Hyo-seop, who was originally cast in the lead role of Jang Seon-kyul, withdrew from the drama due to scheduling conflicts. He was replaced by Yoon Kyun-sang. 
 Filming resumed on September 5, 2018.

Original soundtrack

Part 1

Part 2

Part 3

Part 4

Part 5

Part 6

Part 7

Part 8

Part 9

Part 10

Viewership

Remake
iQiyi announced that there will be a Chinese adaptation of the drama, titled Cleaning Elfs.

The Chinese remake was released on Netflix under the title Use For My Talent in 2021.

Notes

References

External links
  
 
 

Korean-language television shows
JTBC television dramas
2018 South Korean television series debuts
2019 South Korean television series endings
South Korean romantic comedy television series
South Korean television series remade in other languages
Television shows based on South Korean webtoons
Television series by Drama House